William Alan Durban (born 7 July 1941) is a Welsh former international footballer and manager, whose career was at its peak between the 1970s and 1990s. He played in the Football League for Cardiff City, Derby County and was player-manager of Shrewsbury Town. He managed Stoke City (two spells), Sunderland and Cardiff City.

Club career
Durban was brought up in Bracken Road, Margam, Port Talbot. He began his career at Cardiff City, making his debut in a 2–1 win over Derby County in 1959. After initially making an impact on the team he fell out of favour and was transferred to Derby County for £10,000 in July 1963 at the age of 22 having played over 50 times for Cardiff City. He made his Derby debut on 24 August 1963 in a 3–1 defeat to Newcastle United and helped the side to thirteenth place in his first season and his partnership with the newly arrived Eddie Thomas saw the side begin to move up the table, finishing in 9th and 8th position in the following two years.

After finishing in seventeenth place during the 1966–67 season Tim Ward was replaced as the Derby manager by Brian Clough. Under Clough, Durban was moved from inside-forward to an attacking midfield role and was handed the captaincy for the first time in a 5–1 win over his former club Cardiff City. He won a Second Division title in 1968–69 and then a famous First Division championship medal with in 1971–72. He left Derby in 1973 after agreeing to become player-assistant manager of Shrewsbury Town after making 404 appearances for the "Rams" scoring 110 goals. He was appointed manager on 4 December 1973 following the dismissal of Maurice Evans, the man who had signed him three months earlier. With the "Shrews" he appointed former Derby teammate Richie Barker as his assistant and he helped Shrewsbury gain promotion in 1974–75 and consolidate their position in the Third Division. He retired from playing once he was made manager of Stoke City in February 1978.

International career

Durban was handed his debut for Wales on 18 May 1966 in a 1–0 defeat to Brazil at the age of 24. He went on to make 27 appearances for Wales, his final appearance coming on 27 May 1972 in a 0–0 draw with Northern Ireland.

Managerial career
He began his managerial career at Shrewsbury Town in February 1974; managing them until 1978 when he joined Stoke City, having won promotion from the Fourth Division and the Welsh Cup in 1977. He helped Stoke gain promotion back to the First Division in dramatic fashion beating Notts County 1–0 on the final day of the 1978–79. Stoke staved off a relegation battle in 1979–80 finishing in 18th position. During the 1980–81 season Stoke played out an awful 2–0 defeat away at Arsenal and a journalist told Durban that there was no entertainment watching his team's performance, to which Durban replied "This is soccer. If you want entertainment go and watch a bunch of clowns." Stoke finished mid-table in 1980–81 and in the summer of 1981 he shocked Stoke by quitting in favour of becoming manager of Sunderland. One of main reasons he left was that Sunderland had offered to buy his house in Shrewsbury for the same price he bought it.

At Roker Park, Durban inherited a struggling squad and relegation was avoided in the final match of the season 1981–82. He attempted to build a youthful team that would mature, introducing Ally McCoist, Nick Pickering, Barry Venison, and Colin West into the first team. However, he was hampered by a severe restriction of transfer funds. The following two seasons glimpsed promise of better things, but an FA Cup loss hastened boardroom discontent, and he was dismissed in March 1984. After leaving Sunderland he managed Willington in the Northern League for a short spell. Six months after leaving Sunderland, he joined Cardiff City, but his two-year spell in charge at Ninian Park turned into a disaster as they suffered consecutive relegations, falling from the Second Division to Fourth Division, and Durban was replaced by Frank Burrows.

Several years later, Durban returned to Sunderland to become chief scout under Peter Reid. He then briefly returned to Stoke as caretaker for five games at the end of the 1997–98 season but was unable to prevent Stoke's falling into the third tier. In summer 2010, he commenced part-time work as a regional scout for Championship side Norwich City.

In July 2011 Durban re-joined Stoke City on a part-time basis as a mentor for young academy players needing guidance off the pitch. He retired at the age of 75.

Personal life
A book written by David Snowdon about Durban's career was published in 2018 titled Give Us Tomorrow Now: Alan Durban's Mission Impossible, mainly detailing his time at Sunderland.

Career statistics

Club
Source:

A.  The "Other" column constitutes appearances and goals in the European Cup, Texaco Cup, Watney Cup.

International
Source:

Managerial statistics

Honours

As a player
Cardiff City
Football League Second Division runner-up: 1959–60

Derby County
Football League First Division champions: 1971–72
Football League Second Division champions: 1968–69

Individual
 PFA Team of the Year: 1973–74, 1974–75

As a manager
Shrewsbury Town
Football League Fourth Division runner-up: 1974–75
Welsh Cup: 1976–77

Stoke City
Football League Second Division third-place promotion: 1978–79

References

Specific

General

External links
 

1941 births
Living people
Footballers from Bridgend
Wales international footballers
Wales under-23 international footballers
Welsh footballers
Welsh football managers
Cardiff City F.C. players
Derby County F.C. players
Shrewsbury Town F.C. players
English Football League players
Sunderland A.F.C. managers
Shrewsbury Town F.C. managers
Stoke City F.C. managers
Cardiff City F.C. managers
Derby County F.C. non-playing staff
English Football League managers
Association football inside forwards
Association football midfielders